The Orpington is a British breed of chicken. It was bred in the late nineteenth century by William Cook of Orpington, Kent, in south-east England. It was intended to be a dual-purpose breed, to be reared both for eggs and for meat, but soon became exclusively a show bird.

History 

The original Black Orpington was bred by William Cook in 1886 by crossing Minorcas, Langshans and Plymouth Rocks to create a new hybrid bird. Cook selected a black bird that would exhibit well by hiding the dirt and soot of London. When the breed was shown in Madison Square Gardens in 1895, its popularity soared. Cook also bred the Orpington Duck.

The original colours are black, white, buff, blue and splash.  Although there are many additional varieties recognised throughout the world, only the original colours are recognised by the American Standard, the Buff being the most common colour. In the beginning of the twentieth century, Herman Kuhn of Germany developed a Bantam variety. The Bantam retains the appearance of the full-size bird, but in a smaller size. There is a large variety of colours in the Bantam version, including black, blue laced, white, buff, red, buff black laced, barred, buff Columbian, and birchen. The Bantam retains the friendly personality of the Standard breed, and seldom or never flies.

In the UK, the club dedicated to the breed is the Orpington Club, which merged with the Orpington Bantam Club in 1975. The United Orpington Club is the American breeder's club, and the Orpington Club of Australia is the Australian club for the breed.

Characteristics 

There are two similar but different standards for Orpingtons. They also ask for a heavy, broad body with a low stance, with fluffed-out feathers which make it look large; the down from the body covers most of the legs. Other characteristics of their Orpingtons are a curvy shape with a short back and U-shaped underline, and a small head with a medium single comb.

Use 

Orpingtons lay about 175 to 200 medium to large light-brown eggs a year.

It was said that at one time Orpingtons were capable of laying as many as 340 eggs per year.  The decline in production was due to breeders selecting for looks over utility.

References

 The Orpington Club of G.B.
 The Orpington Club of Australia
 The United Orpington Club

External links 

Chicken breeds
Chicken breeds originating in the United Kingdom
Animal breeds on the RBST Watchlist
Animal breeds on the GEH Red List